Santa Casa da Misericórdia is a lay Portuguese charity founded in 1498, whose mission is to treat and support the sick, the disabled, as well as abandoned newborns.

History 

The institution traces its official foundation to 1498, when Queen Leonor opened the Misericórdia of Lisbon. Recently made a widow by the death of King John II of Portugal, the Queen had begun dedicating herself intensely to the sick, poor, orphans, prisoners, artists, and sponsored the founding of the brotherhood, based on the model of previous Italian charities, first founded in Florence in 1244.

The operations of the Misericórdia were overseen by 30 noblemen and 30 laymen in charge of carrying out the 14 Works of Mercy which the Misericórdia committed itself to, seven of which of spiritual nature: 
to teach the humble,
to give good advice,
to correct through charity those who do wrong,
to console those who suffer,
to pardon those who offend us,
to suffer patiently,
to pray for the living and for the deceased; 
and seven of corporeal nature:
to free the enslaved (captive) and to visit the imprisoned, 
to heal and assist the ill, 
to clothe the naked, 
to give food to the hungry, 
to give drink to the thirsty, 
to shelter travelers (pilgrims) and 
to bury the dead. 
All works have their roots in Christian doctrine, found in biblical texts of the Gospel of St. Matthew and the Epistles of St. Paul and other doctors of the Catholic Church. To do this, the fellowship often does not need to have a physical institution, enforcing the fourteen works on the streets, in prisons, etc.

At the encouragement of King Manuel I of Portugal, and his successors, similar organizations were created in many other cities and towns of Portugal and of the former Portuguese Empire, like in Brazil, Macau and even in Nagasaki, Japan. The performance of these institutions had two phases: the first one comprised the period from the mid-eighteenth century to 1837, of a charitable nature; the second, from 1838 to 1940, with concerns of a philanthropic nature.

The União das Misericórdias Portuguesas (UMP) (in Portuguese) provides additional information on the Misericórdias in Portugal and throughout the world. Currently, there are 388 active Misericórdias in Portugal and over 2000 similar organizations in Brazil.

In Brazil 

In Brazil, the Misericórdias emerged in the colonial period, the first one being established in 1539 in Olinda, Pernambuco.

Other locations of the institution 

 Angola:
 Santa Casa da Misericórdia de Luanda
 Santa Casa da Misericórdia de Huambo
 Brazil:
 Santa Casa da Misericórdia de São Paulo
Santa Casa de Misericórdia de Porto Alegre
Santa Casa de Misericórdia of Feira de Santana
 Spain:
 Santa Casa da Misericórdia de Pamplona
 Santa Casa da Misericórdia de Barcelona
 Santa Casa da Misericórdia de Bilbao
 Santa Casa da Misericórdia de Azpeitia
 Santa Casa da Misericórdia de Olivença (Portugal)
 Santa Casa da Misericórdia de Ávila
 Santa Casa da Misericórdia de Alcuéscar (Cáceres)
 Santa Casa da Misericórdia de Tudela
 France:
 Santa Casa da Misericórdia de Paris
 Italy:
 Santa Casa da Misericórdia de Florença
 Luxemburg:
 Santa Casa da Misericórdia de Luxemburgo
 Macao Special Administrative Region of the People's Republic of China:
Santa Casa da Misericórdia de Macau
 Mozambique:
 Santa Casa da Misericórdia de Maputo
 Palestine:
 Santa Casa da Misericórdia de Belém
 Islands of São Tomé e Príncipe:
 Santa Casa da Misericórdia de São Tomé e Príncipe
 Ukraine:
 Santa Casa da Misericórdia de Kiev

References

External links

União das Misericórdias Portuguesas (UMP)
Santa Casa da Misericórdia de Lisboa (SCML)

Charities based in Portugal
Fraternities and sororities in Portugal
15th century in Portugal
1498 establishments in Portugal
15th-century Catholicism